Pierre Kunde Malong (born 26 July 1995) is a Cameroonian professional footballer who plays for German Bundesliga club VfL Bochum, on loan from Olympiacos, and the Cameroon national team as a central midfielder.

Club career
Born in Limbe, Malong started his senior career in Spain with Alcobendas CF; he made his senior debut for the club on 11 November 2012 by starting in a 2–0 Regional Preferente home win against EF Periso. His first goal came the following 3 March, in a 2–0 success at Atlético Leones de Castilla.

In 2013 Kunde moved to Atlético Madrid, returning to youth football. The following year, he was promoted to the reserves in Segunda División B, immediately becoming a regular starter but suffering relegation in his first season.

On 21 July 2016, Kunde was loaned to Extremadura UD for one year, still in the third division. He scored a career-best 11 goals during the campaign, with braces against San Fernando CD (3–1 away win), Linares Deportivo (3–1 away win) and Atlético Mancha Real (2–1 away win).

On 25 July 2017, Kunde joined Granada CF, freshly relegated to Segunda División, on a one-year loan deal. He made his professional debut on 20 August, coming on a late substitute for Javier Espinosa in a 0–0 home draw against Albacete Balompié.

Kunde scored his first professional goal on 8 October 2017, netting the last in a 2–0 home defeat of CD Lugo. The following 22 April, he scored a brace in a 3–3 home draw against Cultural y Deportiva Leonesa.

On 6 July 2018, Kunde was transferred to Bundesliga side 1. FSV Mainz 05 and signed a four-year contract.

On 22 June 2021, Kunde sign a three-year contract with Greek giants Olympiacos after undergoing a medical. The Greek side will reportedly be paying a little less than €2 million for the 25-year-old international, whose contract with Mainz expires in 2022.

International career
Kunde represented Cameroon at under-18 and under-23 levels, the latter in the 2017 Islamic Solidarity Games. He made his full international debut on 27 May 2018, starting in a 0–1 friendly loss against Burkina Faso.

Career statistics

Club

International

Honours 
Olympiacos

Super League Greece: 2021–22

Cameroon

 Africa Cup of Nations : 2021

References

External links

1995 births
Living people
Cameroonian footballers
People from Southwest Region (Cameroon)
Association football midfielders
Segunda División players
Segunda División B players
Tercera División players
Atlético Madrid B players
Extremadura UD footballers
Granada CF footballers
Cameroon international footballers
1. FSV Mainz 05 players
Bundesliga players
Olympiacos F.C. players
Super League Greece players
Cameroonian expatriate footballers
Expatriate footballers in Spain
Cameroonian expatriate sportspeople in Spain
Expatriate footballers in Germany
Cameroonian expatriates in Germany
Cameroonian expatriate sportspeople in Germany
Expatriate footballers in Greece
Cameroonian expatriates in Greece
Cameroonian expatriate sportspeople in Greece
2019 Africa Cup of Nations players
2021 Africa Cup of Nations players
2022 FIFA World Cup players